Valencia Club de Fútbol (also known as Los Che) are a professional football club based in Valencia, Spain. This article contains honours won, and statistics and records pertaining to the club.

Honours

National titles
La Liga
Winners (6): 1941–42, 1943–44, 1946–47, 1970–71, 2001–02, 2003–04

Runners-up (6): 1947–48, 1948–49, 1952–53, 1971–72, 1989–90, 1995–96

Third place (10): 1940–41, 1949–50, 1950–51, 1953–54, 1988–89, 1999–2000, 2005–06, 2009–10, 2010–11, 2011–12

Copa del Rey
Winners (8): 1941, 1948–49, 1954, 1966–67, 1978–79, 1998–99, 2007–08, 2018–19

Runners-up (10): 1934, 1944, 1944–45, 1946, 1952, 1969–70, 1970–71, 1971–72, 1994–95, 2021–22

Supercopa de España
Winners: 1999
Runners-up (3): 2002, 2004, 2008

Copa Eva Duarte (Predecessor to the Supercopa de España)
Winners: 1949
Runners-up: 1947

Copa Presidente FEF (Predecessor to the Supercopa de España)
 Runners-up: 1947

Segunda División
Winners: 1930–31,  1986–87

European titles
UEFA Champions League
Runners-up (2): 1999–2000, 2000–01

UEFA Cup Winners' Cup
Winners: 1979–80

UEFA Cup / UEFA Europa League
Winners: 2003–04
Semi-finals (3): 2011–12, 2013–14, 2018–19

Inter-cities Fairs Cup:Winners: 1961–62, 1962–63
Runners-up: 1963–64

European Super Cup / UEFA Super CupWinners: 1980, 2004

UEFA Intertoto CupWinners: 1998
Runners-up: 2005

Regional titles
Levante Championship / Valencian Championship (10): 1922–23, 1924–25, 1925–26, 1926–27, 1930–31, 1931–32, 1932–33, 1933–34, 1936–37, 1939–40

Friendly competitions
Naranja Trophy (27): 1961, 1962, 1970, 1975, 1978, 1979, 1980, 1983, 1984, 1988, 1989, 1991, 1993, 1994, 1996, 1998, 1999, 2001, 2002, 2006, 2008, 2009, 2010, 2011, 2012, 2014, 2016.
Ciudad de Valencia Trophy (4): 1988, 1990, 1993, 1994
Copa Generalitat Trophy (3): 1999, 2001, 2002
Ciudad de la Línea Trophy (2): 1970, 1993
Martini Rossi Trophy (2): 1948–49, 1949–50
Teresa Herrera Trophy (1): 1952
Concepción Arenal Trophy (1): 1954
Ciudad de México Trophy (1): 1966
Ramón de Carranza Trophy (1): 1967
Bodas de Oro Trophy (1): 1969
Tournoi de Paris (1): 1975
Ibérico Trophy (1):  1975
Comunidad Valenciana Trophy (1):  1982
75 Aniversario Levante UD Trophy (1):  1984
Festa d'Elx Trophy (1): 1991
Groningen Trophy (1): 1992
La Laguna Trophy (1): 1992
Ciudad de Palma Trophy (1): 1993
Villa de Benidorm Trophy (1): 1993
80 Aniversario San Mamés Trophy (1): 1993
Joan Gamper Trophy (1): 1994
Ciudad de Alicante Trophy (1): 1994
Ciudad de Benidorm Trophy (1): 1994
Ciudad de Mérida Trophy (1): 1995
Trofeu Ciutat de Barcelona (1): 1995
Copa Fuji Trophy (1): 1997
Trofeo de la Cerámica (1): 2001
Ladbrokes.com cup Trophy (1): 2003
Thomas Cook Trophy (1): 2007
Borussia Dortmund 100th Anniversary tournament trophy (1): 2009
Sparkasse Emsland Cup (1): 2009
CD Acero 90th Anniversary Trophy (1): 2009
Kärnten Soccer Cup (1): 2011
Emirates Cup (1): 2014

Recent seasons

Statistics in La Liga
 Average Attendance: 46,894
 Socios: 45,116
 Seasons in First Division: 77
 Seasons in Second Division: 4
 Historical classification in La Liga: 3rd place.
 Highest position in League: 1st place
 Lowest position in League: 16th place
 Games played: 2,474
 Games won: 1,109
 Games drawn: 569
 Games lost: 796
 Goals for: 4,108
 Goals against: 3,217
 Goal difference: 891
 Overall points: 3,105
 Biggest home win: Valencia 8–0 Sporting de Gijón (29/11/53)
 Biggest away win: Lleida 1–6 Valencia (04/02/51) and Málaga 1–6 Valencia (31/01/04)
 Biggest home defeat: Valencia 0–5 Real Madrid (20/01/13)
 Biggest defeat: Sevilla 10–3 Valencia (13/10/40) and Barcelona 7–0 Valencia (03/02/16)
 Pichichi's won: Mundo (2): 1941–42 – 27 goals, 1943–44 – 27 goals; Ricardo Alos: 1957–58 – 19 goals; Waldo Machado: 1966–67 – 24 goals; Mario Kempes (2): 1976–77 – 24 goals, 1977–78 – 28 goals.
 Zamora's won: Ignacio Eizaguirre (2): 1943–44 – 32 goals conceded, 1944–45 – 28 goals conceded; Goyo: 1957–58 – 28 goals conceded; Ángel Abelardo: 1970–71 – 19 goals conceded; Jose Luis Manzanedo: 1978–79 – 26 goals conceded; José Manuel Ochotorena: 1988–89 – 25 goals conceded; Santiago Cañizares (3): 2000–01 – 34 goals conceded, 2001–02 – 23 goals conceded, 2003–04 – 25 goals conceded.
 Most games played: Fernando (554), Arias (518), David Albelda (485), Miguel Ángel Angulo (430)
 Most goals scored: Mundo (206), Waldo (158), Mario Kempes (146), Fernando (143)

Statistics in European competition
 Biggest win: Valencia 7–0 Genk (2011–12)
 Heaviest loss: Dunfermline Athletic 6–2 Valencia (1961–62); Valencia 1–5 Napoli (1992–93); Valencia 1–5 Internazionale (2004–05)

General statistics
 Most goals: Mundo 238 goals
 Most goals in a season: Mario Kempes 28 goals
 Most games: Fernando 554 games

Historical data
 First goal in VCF History: Pepe Llobet (25 May 1919), Valencia 1–1 Gimnastico CF

Overall seasons table in La Liga
{|class="wikitable"
|-bgcolor="#efefef"
!  Pos.
! Club  
! Season In D1
! Pl.
! W
! D
! L
! GS
! GA
! Dif.
! Pts
!Champion
!2nd place
!3rd place
!4th place
|-
|align=center|3|Valencia|align=center |80|align=center|2588
|align=center|1163
|align=center|598
|align=center|827
|align=center|4296
|align=center|3356
|align=center|940
|align=center|3296| align=center bgcolor=gold| 6| align=center bgcolor=silver| 6| align=center bgcolor=cc9966| 10| align=center | 11'|}

Last updated: 6 January 2016

Pos. = Position; Pl = Match played; W = Win; D = Draw; L = Lost; GS = Goals scored; GA = Goals against; P = Points.
Colors: Gold = winner; Silver = runner-up.

Milestone goals in La Liga

Milestone goals in UEFA Champions League/European Cup

Appearance recordsCompetitive, professional matches only.Goalscoring recordsCompetitive, professional matches only.''

Pichichi Trophy winners

Zamora Trophy winners

Transfer records

Footnotes

A.  The "Europe" column constitutes goals and appearances in the UEFA Competition.
B.  The "Other" column constitutes goals and appearances in the Segunda División, Supercopa de España and the Copa de la Liga.

References

External links
Honours at official website [archived version, 2009]

Records And Statistics
Valencia
Records